Toowoomba State High School (TSHS) is a co-educational State High School located in Mount Lofty, Toowoomba, Queensland, Australia.  TSHS was established in 1919.

Campuses
From 1998 to 2016 Toowoomba State High School consisted of two campuses, the Mount Lofty campus, and the Wilsonton campus. In 2017, they became two separate State High Schools. The incumbent Queensland Education Minister (Kate Jones) decided that as of Term 1, 2017 the two campuses would become two 'Band 10' schools.

A new $5 million hall was also announced for the Wilsonton Campus.

In August, 2016, a public survey was conducted in order to determine Wilsonton Campus' new name, uniform as well as sports logo for 2017 onwards. After the survey was conducted, it was decided that Wilsonton Campus would be renamed  Wilsonton State High School. The sports polo shirt would be black, purple and green with a white trim and the sports logo would be a Pegasus.

Toowoomba State High School

Toowoomba State High School is located in the suburb of Mount Lofty which is in the north-east corner of Toowoomba, Queensland. The school relocated there from Margaret Street over a period of two years in 1961 and 1962. The school caters for approximately 900 students (2015) in years seven to twelve.

Wilsonton Campus
The Wilsonton campus of Toowoomba State High School was located in the suburb of Wilsonton Heights which is in the north-west corner of Toowoomba. It was opened in 1998 as the fourth secondary campus for Toowoomba's youth by then Education Minister, Bob Quinn. The school catered for approximately 840 students (2015) in years seven to twelve.

On 9 August 2016, Education Minister Kate Jones announced that the Wilsonton campus would be separated from the Toowoomba State High School.  The new Wilsonton State High School opened on the first school day in 2017 (23 January 2017). The new name for the school was decided through a community consultation process.

Vivo
In 2012 T.S.H.S became the first school in Australia to use Vivo to recognize the work and progress of students. Vivo is an online reward scheme for responsible behavior where teachers give students Vivo points. And then at the end of the semester or school year, the students could redeem their Vivo points to spend on the online Vivo store for rewards and vouchers to school events. T.S.H.S stopped using Vivo in 2016, and swapped to a 'star card', similar to a coffee card, for junior students.

The arts
T.S.H.S is well known for their excellence in The Arts. The school has bands, choirs and dance troupes. One of the well-known choirs at the school is the "Lofty Glee Choir". The choirs and bands perform at many school and public events.

Sports
Toowoomba State High School is also keen on excellence in the sporting arena. Each year the school has their Swimming Carnival, Athletics Carnival and Cross Country.

Former students

 John Alexander "Jack" French, V.C. [Local Hero]
 Glynis Nunn (née Saunders) [Heptathlete]
 Greg Ritchie [Australian Cricketer]
 Michael Berkman, Greens MLA for the inner-Brisbane seat of Maiwar in the Queensland Legislative Assembly.
 Ellen Roberts, prominent climate campaigner, named in Queensland's 100 most influential people in 2018
 Derek Volker, senior public servant
 Thomas Meadowcroft (Freelance composer and musician)
 Gary Spence (Qld State President of the Liberal National Party; Managing Director of Brown Consulting)
 Peter Campbell (Qantas pilot; Royal Australian Air Force flight officer stationed at 34 Squadron, the VIP unit in Canberra; mechanical engineer)
 Lawrence Scanlon (winemaker, chicken schnitzel enthusiast)
 Travis Passier (born 26 April 1989) is an Australian volleyball player. He competed for Australia at the 2012 Summer Olympics. Passier is a 6’9" middle blocker for the Australia men's national volleyball team.
 Ian Craig Leslie (born 6 July 1942) is a multi-award Australian television journalist and corporate communicator. He is best known for his 12 years (1977-1989) as a member of the original team on what was Australian television's highest-rating show 60 Minutes
 Queensland Police Commissioner Ian Stewart was born and grew up in Toowoomba and was Toowoomba State High School captain
 Owen Glyndwr (Glyn) Jenkins - Elected member of the Parliament of Victoria from 1970 to 1982

See also

List of schools in Queensland

References

External links
 Toowoomba State High School Website

Public high schools in Queensland
Educational institutions established in 1919
Schools in Toowoomba
1919 establishments in Australia